The Northern line is a London Underground line. 

Northern line can also refer to:

Train lines and services

United Kingdom
North London line, part of the London Overground
Northern City Line, between Moorgate and Finsbury Park
Northern line (Merseyrail)

Elsewhere
Nordland Line, Norway
Northern Line (Cape Town)
Northern Line (İZBAN), Turkey
Northern Line (SRT), Thailand
Northern line (Sri Lanka)
T9 Northern Line (Sydney), Australia
Northern Commuter line, Dublin
Linha do Norte (English: Northern Line), a railway line in Portugal, connecting Lisbon at Santa Apolónia to Porto at Campanhã

Other uses
Northern Line (group)
Northern Airport Line, China
Northern Limit Line, the maritime border between North and South Korea
The Northern Line, a magazine